Herálec is name of several places in the Czech Republic:
 Herálec (Havlíčkův Brod District), a municipality and village in the Vysočina Region
 Herálec (Žďár nad Sázavou District), a municipality and village in the Vysočina Region